The 2012 Akron Zips football team represented the University of Akron in the 2012 NCAA Division I FBS football season. They were led by first-year head coach Terry Bowden and played their home games at InfoCision Stadium – Summa Field. They were a member of the East Division of the Mid-American Conference. They finished the season 1–11, 0–8 in MAC play to finish in last place in the East Division.

Schedule

 Source: Schedule

Game summaries

UCF

@ FIU

Morgan State

@ Tennessee

Miami (OH)

Bowling Green

@ Ohio

Northern Illinois

@ Central Michigan

@ Kent State

Massachusetts

@ Toledo

Roster

References

Akron
Akron Zips football seasons
Akron Zips football